Sabanalarga is a town and municipality in the Department of Casanare, Colombia.

Climate
Sabanalarga has a very wet tropical monsoon climate (Am).

References

Municipalities of Casanare Department